"Crank" is a song by English alternative rock band Catherine Wheel, released 28 June 1993 by Fontana Records. It was the first single from their 1993 album Chrome. The song remains one of the most popular songs from Catherine Wheel.

The song reached No. 66 on the UK Singles Chart and No. 5 in the US on Billboard's Modern Rock Tracks chart.

Track listing
 UK 12" vinyl picture disc
 "Crank" – 3:46
 "Black Metallic" (Peel Session 1991) – 7:55
 "Painful Thing" (Peel Session 1991) – 5:52
 Netherlands CD single
 "Crank" – 3:45
 "Come Back Again" – 4:24
 UK CD single 1
 "Crank" – 3:45
 "La La Lala La" – 5:26
 "Pleasure" – 5:22
 "Tongue Twisted" – 4:50
 UK CD single 2
 "Crank" – 3:45
 "La La Lala La" – 5:26
 "Something Strange" – 1:46
 UK CD single 3
 "Crank" – 3:45
 "Pleasure" – 5:22
 "Tongue Twisted" – 4:50
 UK cassette single (same two tracks on each side)
 "Crank" – 3:45
 "Come Back Again" – 4:24

Personnel
Catherine Wheel
Rob Dickinson – vocals, guitar
Brian Futter – vocals, guitar
Dave Hawes – bass
Neil Sims – drums, percussion

Charts

References

1993 singles
1993 songs
Fontana Records singles
Song recordings produced by Gil Norton
Catherine Wheel songs